Old Trafford is a cricket ground in Old Trafford, Greater Manchester, England. It opened in 1857 as the home of Manchester Cricket Club and has been the home of Lancashire County Cricket Club since 1864. From 2013 onwards it has been known as Emirates Old Trafford due to a sponsorship deal with the Emirates airline.

Old Trafford is England's second oldest Test venue after The Oval and hosted the first Ashes Test in England in 1884. The venue has hosted the Cricket World Cup five times (1975, 1979, 1983, 1999 and 2019). Old Trafford holds the record for both most World Cup matches hosted (17) and most semi-finals hosted (5). In 1956, the first 10-wicket haul in a single innings was achieved by England bowler Jim Laker who achieved bowling figures of 19 wickets for 90 runs—a bowling record which is unmatched in Test and first-class cricket. In 1990, a 17 year old Sachin Tendulkar scored 119 not out against England, which was the first of his 100 international centuries. In the 1993 Ashes Test at Old Trafford, leg-spinner Shane Warne bowled Mike Gatting with the "Ball of the Century". In 2020 the ground was used as one of two biosecure venues, alongside the Ageas Bowl, for the tours involving West Indies and Pakistan which were regulated due to the COVID-19 pandemic.

After Old Trafford lost test status in 2009, extensive redevelopment of the ground to increase capacity and modernise facilities saw the restoration of the pavilion and creation of The Point, a £12 million stand overlooking the pitch.

History

Early history
The site was first used as a cricket ground in 1857, when the Manchester Cricket Club moved onto the meadows of the de Trafford estate. Despite the construction of a large pavilion (for the amateurs—the professionals used a shed at the opposite end of the ground), Old Trafford's first years were rocky: accessible only along a footpath from the railway station, the ground was situated out in the country, and games only attracted small crowds. It was not until the Roses match of 1875 that significant numbers attended a game. When W. G. Grace brought Gloucestershire in 1878, Old Trafford saw 28,000 spectators over three days, and this provoked improvements to access and facilities.

In 1884, Old Trafford became the second English ground, after The Oval, to stage Test cricket: with the first day being lost to rain, England drew with Australia. Expansion of the ground followed over the next decade, with the decision being taken to construct a new pavilion in 1894.

The ground was purchased outright from the de Traffords in 1898, for £24,372, as crowds increased, with over 50,000 spectators attending the 1899 Test match.

In 1902, the Australian Victor Trumper hit a hundred before lunch on the first day; Australia went on to win the Test by 3 runs—the third-closest Test result in history.

Crowds fell through the early 20th century, and the ground was closed during the First World War; however, in the conflict's aftermath, crowd numbers reached new heights. Investment followed throughout the inter-war period, and during this time, Lancashire experienced their most successful run to date, gaining four championship titles in five years.

During the Second World War, Old Trafford was used as a transit camp for troops returning from Dunkirk, and as a supply depot. In December 1940, the ground was hit by bombs, damaging or destroying several stands. Despite this damage—and the failure of an appeal to raise funds for repairs—cricket resumed promptly after the war, with German PoWs being paid a small wage to prepare the ground. The 'Victory Test' between England and Australia of August 1945 proved to be extremely popular, with 76,463 seeing it over three days.

Post-Second World War
Differences of opinion between the club's committee and players led to a bad run of form in the 1950s and early 1960s; this consequently saw gate money drop, and a lack of investment. After 1964, however, the situation was reversed, and 1969 saw the first Indoor Cricket Centre opened.
In 1956 Jim Laker became the first person to take all 10 wickets in a Test match innings, achieving figures of 10 for 53 in the fourth Test against Australia (the only other bowlers to take all 10 wickets in an innings are Anil Kumble of India in 1999 and Ajaz Patel of New Zealand in 2021). Having also taken 9 for 37 in the first innings, Laker ended the match with record figures of 19 for 90, which remain unmatched to this day.
On 1 May 1963 the first ever one day cricket match took place at Old Trafford, as the Gillette Cup was launched. Lancashire beat Leicestershire in a preliminary knock-out game, as 16th and 17th finishers in the Championship the previous year, to decide who would fill the 16th spot in the One Day competition.
Following Lancashire's reign as One Day champions in the 1970s, a programme of renovation and replacement was initiated in 1981. This changed the face of the ground to the extent that, now, only the Pavilion "is recognisable to a visitor who last watched or played a game in, say, the early 1980s".
In 1981 Ian Botham hit 118, including six sixes (the second greatest number in an Ashes innings), which he has called "one of the three innings I would like to tell my grandchildren about". England went on to win the Ashes after being lampooned in the national media for such poor performances.

In 1990, Sachin Tendulkar scored his first Test hundred at the age of 17—becoming the second-youngest centurion—to help India draw. In 1993, Shane Warne bowled the "Ball of the Century" to Mike Gatting at the ground. In the same game, Graham Gooch was out handling the ball for 133—only the sixth out of nine times this has ever happened. In 1995, Dominic Cork took a hat-trick for England against the West Indies. In 2000, both Mike Atherton and Alec Stewart played their hundredth Tests, against the West Indies. In the Third Test of the 2005 Ashes series the match ended in a nailbiting draw, with 10,000 fans shut out of the ground on the final day as tickets were sold out. England went on to win the series regaining the Ashes for the first time since 1986/87. In 2020 the ground was used as one of two biosecure venues, alongside the Ageas Bowl, for the tours involving West Indies and Pakistan which were regulated due to the COVID-19 pandemic.

The Ground
The cricket ground is near the Old Trafford football stadium (a five-minute walk away down Warwick Road and Sir Matt Busby Way), in the borough of Trafford in Greater Manchester, approximately two miles south west of Manchester city centre. Its capacity is 22,000 for Test matches, for which temporary stands are erected, and 15,000 for other matches. Since 1884, it has hosted 74 Tests, the third-highest number in England, behind Lord's and The Oval.

The Ends
The northern End is the James Anderson End, formerly the Pavilion End. ("The Point" is the distinctive, red conference center immediately west of The Pavilion.)

The southern End is the Brian Statham End, named in honour of the former Lancashire and England player. The red building at this Statham (south) End is the Media & Players Center.

A section of Warwick Road to the east is also called Brian Statham Way. Immediately abutting the ground to the south-east is the Old Trafford tram stop.

Old Trafford has a reputation for unpredictable weather. Old Trafford is the only ground in England where a Test match has been abandoned without a ball being bowled—and this has happened here twice in 1890 and 1938, though before five-day test matches were introduced. Before Cardiff hosted its first Test match in July 2009, Old Trafford was reputedly the wettest Test ground in the country; Manchester is situated to the west of the Pennines and faces prevailing winds and weather fronts from the  Atlantic Ocean.

These prevailing conditions have encouraged Lancashire to keep the ground as well-drained as possible, most recently through the acquisition of a hover cover in 2007, and the installation of new drains towards the end of the 2008 season.

In the second Test of 1938 in a desperate effort to ensure play after heavy rain the groundstaff moved the turf from the practice pitch to the square—a unique attempt. In 2010–11 the wickets were relaid, changing their extremely unusual east–west axis to a more conventional north–south layout. The Brian Statham End (previously the Warwick Road End) to the east, and Stretford End to the west, were replaced by the Pavilion End to the north, and the Brian Statham End to the south.

The Pavilion

The three-tiered Victorian members' pavilion was built in 1895 for £10,000. Hit by a bomb in 1940—which destroyed the members' dining room and groundsman's quarters—most of the pavilion was rebuilt. One million pounds was spent on a new roof after it began to leak in 2003.

The Pavilion's position was noteworthy in that, until 2010, it sat parallel to the wickets, rather than behind them, presenting the members with one of the worst viewing angles possible. It contains batting and bowling Honour Boards, unveiled during the 2004 Test match. The pavilion underwent redevelopment at the start of 2012 and was reopened for the YB40 game against Scotland.

When the bowler is operating from the southern Brian Statham End, television viewers will be looking at the Pavilion with its two clock towers directly behind the keeper.

The Point

The Point, Old Trafford's distinctive £12 million conference centre, and at 1,000 seats one of the largest multi-purpose conference facilities in North West England, opened in 2010.  It is positioned immediately west of the Pavilion, and hence, is northwest of the cricket pitch.

Media and Players Centre

Old Trafford was unusual in that there were two media stands at opposite ends of the ground prior to the new Media Centre which opened in September 2012. Television and radio commentators previously operated in temporary television studios and commentary boxes at the Stretford End which were perched on hospitality boxes. The Media and Players Centre is at the Brian Statham End (southern end). When the bowler is operating from the northern James Anderson End, television viewers will be looking at the Media and Players Center directly behind the keeper.

Cricket practice school
The idea of an indoor school was born in 1951, when nets were strung up in the Members' Dining Room in the pavilion. A permanent facility was built in 1969, and replaced in 1997. The current building stands to the north-west of the pitch; it contains five 60-metre lanes on various surfaces, several conference rooms, and a large shop.

The hotel
To the north-east of the ground, immediately adjacent to the Pavilion is a 150-bed Hilton Garden hotel which opened in late 2017. Similar in architecture to The Point on the other side of the Pavilion, half the rooms have a balcony with a full view of the pitch. Previously, this was occupied by the Old Trafford Lodge which opened in 1999. The hotel had 68 rooms, 36 having unobstructed views of the playing surface. It was demolished in 2016 and the new hotel opened in late 2017.

Redevelopment 2003–2017

Following rejection of plans, in 2003, to sell Old Trafford, and move the club to a new purpose-built stadium in East Manchester, the focus was switched to upgrading the current ground. Lancashire CCC, with a coalition of businesses, are in the process of making the cricket ground the centre of an anticipated  development, in a mixed-use scheme involving business, residential, retail, hotel and leisure facilities.

The first phase of redevelopment saw the laying of new drains in Autumn 2008. In 2009, the Stretford end of the ground was closed to facilitate destruction of the County Suite, Tyldesley Suite, 'K' and 'L' Stands and the scoreboard; The Point, overshadowing new seating to the west of the pavilion, opened in June 2010. During the 2010/11 winter the wickets were turned from their previous east–west axis to a more typical north–south alignment, which prevents the low evening sun from interfering with matches, and increased the number of available wickets by five, to sixteen. Many of Lancashire's home games for the 2011 season were transferred to out grounds while the new wickets 'bedded in'.

The main planning process began in September 2008, but faced stiff legal opposition. Since Tesco pledged £21 million to the redevelopment, the stadium's planning application included a request for a new supermarket nearby. Trafford Council gave this joint proposal permission in March 2010—a decision which was initially called in by the Communities Secretary for Judicial Review, before the go-ahead was given in September 2010. Derwent Holdings, a property development company denied permission to build a supermarket at the nearby White City retail park, then called for a Judicial Review. Although this was turned down by the High Court in March 2011, the case went to the Court of Appeal. Lancashire took the risky decision to begin work ahead of the matter being resolved, in order to qualify for grants from the North West Development Agency before it was wound up. However, the Court of Appeal ruled in Lancashire's favour in July 2011, and denied leave to further appeal.

Work therefore began on this main phase in summer 2011, beginning with the installation of permanent floodlights and a new video screen. A new 'Players and Media' facility, mimicking to some degree the design of The Point, has been built on the site of the demolished Washbrook-Statham stand, with a two-tiered cantilever stand being erected on either side. The Pavilion has been renovated to have its sloped roof replaced with two modern glass storeys, finished in April 2013.

The media facilities and corporate boxes on the western side of the ground have been demolished, leaving an empty space, which will be used for temporary seating or a stage when required.

The Old Trafford Lodge opened in 1999; however, it has been since demolished and replaced by the Hilton Garden Inn Emirates Old Trafford. It is a Hilton Garden Inn 150-bedroom hotel for Hilton Worldwide. It completed in July 2017.

Uses

Cricket

The ground is used heavily throughout the summer as the base of Lancashire County Cricket Club, with other home games being played at Stanley Park, Blackpool, Birkdale in Southport and at Aigburth in Liverpool. Until 2008, Old Trafford commonly hosted a Test match each year; none were hosted in 2009, 2011 or 2012 due to sub-standard facilities, although following redevelopment, Old Trafford hosted an Ashes Test in 2013, and further Tests in 2014 and 2016. One Day Internationals and/or International Twenty20s continue to be hosted every year.

In Tests, the highest team score posted here is 656/8 dec by Australia against England on 23 July 1964. The leading run scorers here are Denis Compton (818 runs), Mike Atherton (729 runs) and Alec Stewart (704 runs). The leading wicket takers are Alec Bedser (51 wickets), James Anderson (28 wickets) and Jim Laker (27 wickets).

In ODIs, the highest team score posted here is 397/6 by England against Afghanistan on 18 June 2019. The leading run scorers here are Graham Gooch (405 runs), Eoin Morgan (368 runs), and Allan Lamb (341 runs). The leading wicket takers are Bob Willis (15 wickets), James Anderson (14 wickets) and Darren Gough (13 wickets).

Musical venue
The ground is occasionally used as a venue for large-scale concerts, with a maximum capacity of 50,000. Although the old stage location, in front of the Indoor Cricket School, has been built on buildings on the western side of the ground, which were cleared in 2013 to allow space for a larger stage. The concert capacity increased to 65,000 after redevelopment.

Other
The Old Trafford Lodge, The Point, and other corporate facilities are open all year round, as are the ground's car parks, situated to the north and west of the ground.

Transport
The ground is served by the adjacent Old Trafford tram stop on the Manchester Metrolink's Altrincham Line.

See also
 Lancashire County Cricket Club in 2005
 List of cricket grounds in England and Wales
 List of Test cricket grounds
 List of international cricket centuries at Old Trafford

Notes

References

External links

 Old Trafford Cricket Ground on Cricinfo
 Old Trafford Cricket Ground on ECB
 Lancashire County Cricket Club

Buildings and structures in Trafford
Sports venues in Greater Manchester
Cricket grounds in Greater Manchester
Test cricket grounds in England
Stretford
Music venues in Greater Manchester
Sports venues completed in 1857
1857 establishments in England
1999 Cricket World Cup stadiums
1975 Cricket World Cup stadiums
1979 Cricket World Cup stadiums
1983 Cricket World Cup stadiums
2019 Cricket World Cup stadiums